Aleksandar Ilić (born 8 April 1994) is a Bosnian-Herzegovinian footballer who most recently played as a forward for Drina Zvornik.

Club career
Born in Loznica, Bosnia and Herzegovina, he played mostly with FK Drina Zvornik during his early career.  The exception was a season long spell in the neighboring Croatia with Prva HNL side Istra 1961 in the 2013–14 season.

During the winter-break of the 2015–16 season, Ilić moved this time to Bosnian Eastern neighbour, Serbia, and joined Serbian SuperLiga side FK Javor Ivanjica, but instead of getting any chances to play, he was loaned back to Drina Zvornik where he played till the end of the season. In summer 2016 Ilić rejoined permanently Dina Zvornik again.

References

sportnet.hr profile 

1994 births
Living people
Sportspeople from Loznica
Association football forwards
Bosnia and Herzegovina footballers
FK Drina Zvornik players
NK Istra 1961 players
FK Javor Ivanjica players
Trikala F.C. players
FK Bregalnica Štip players
FC Shirak players
NK Vitez players
Croatian Football League players
Premier League of Bosnia and Herzegovina players
Football League (Greece) players
Macedonian First Football League players
Armenian Premier League players
First League of the Republika Srpska players
Bosnia and Herzegovina expatriate footballers
Expatriate footballers in Croatia
Bosnia and Herzegovina expatriate sportspeople in Croatia
Expatriate footballers in Greece
Bosnia and Herzegovina expatriate sportspeople in Greece
Expatriate footballers in North Macedonia
Bosnia and Herzegovina expatriate sportspeople in North Macedonia
Expatriate footballers in Armenia
Bosnia and Herzegovina expatriate sportspeople in Armenia